The emblem of Kazakhstan ( Qаzаqstаn eltаñbasy) was adopted on June 4, 1992. The designers of the emblem are Jandarbek Melibekov and Shoqan Walikhanov. About 245 projects and 67 description designs of the future arms took part in the final competition. Like other post-Soviet republics whose symbols do not predate the October Revolution, the current emblem retains some components of the Soviet one, in this case, rising sun rays and star. Prior to 1992, Kazakhstan had an emblem similar to all other Soviet Republics.

Overview
The emblem is an image of a shanyrak (Şañyraq; more often seen in the Russian transcription, Шанырак, shanyrak), the upper dome-like portion of a yurt, against a sky blue background which irradiates (in the form of sun rays) uyks (supports) set off by wings of mythical horses, inspired by Tulpar which represent bravery. The circle shape of the Emblem is a symbol of life and eternity. The shanyrak symbolizes family well-being, peace and calmness. 

A design very similar to the Kazakh shanyraq is used in the flag of neighboring Kyrgyzstan; it is known as tunduk in Kyrgyz.

The colour version of the national emblem of the Republic of Kazakhstan consists of two colours: gold and sky blue. The golden colour corresponds to the bright, clear future of the Kazakh people, and the blue sky colour is a symbol of aspiration for peace, consent, friendship and unity with all people.

The name of the country in Kazakh, QAZAQSTAN, is in the lower part of the emblem. The name was in cyrillic script (ҚA3AҚCTAH) before the national standard of the Emblem of Kazakhstan was amended on November 1, 2018.

Gallery

See also
Emblem of the Kazakh Soviet Socialist Republic
Flag of Kazakhstan
Armorial of sovereign states

References

External links

National symbols of Kazakhstan
Kazakhstan
Kazakhstan
Kazakhstan
Kazakhstan